Textile Building may refer to:

Textile Building (Cincinnati, OH)
Textile Building (Starkville, Mississippi), see National Register of Historic Places listings in Oktibbeha County, Mississippi
Textile Building (Tribeca), a historic 1901 building in the Tribeca section of New York City
The Textile Building at Clemson College, now Godfrey Hall at Clemson University's Campus of Clemson University
The New Textile Building in Toronto, Canada, designed by Benjamin Brown (architect)